Paul Terence Hirons (born 6 March 1971) is an English former football player and manager who played as a midfielder.

Playing career
Hirons began his career in the academy at Bristol City, before signing for Torquay United in January 1989. On 6 January 1990, Hirons scored his first Torquay goal, scoring the only goal in a 1–0 FA Cup upset against West Ham United. In total, Hirons made 21 Football League appearances for Torquay.

In 1990, following his release from Torquay, Hirons dropped down to non-league, signing for hometown club Bath City. Hirons later played for Yeovil Town, Westbury United, Cheltenham Town, Clevedon Town, Yate Town, Forest Green Rovers, Taunton Town and Trowbridge Town.

Coaching career
Whilst still playing, Hirons was appointed manager of Keynsham Town in 1998. In 2001, after guiding Keynsham to promotion from the Western League Division One, Hirons was appointed manager of Paulton Rovers.

Following his managerial career, Hirons moved into coaching, as well as taking up a scouting role at Bristol City.

References

1971 births
Living people
Sportspeople from Bath, Somerset
English footballers
Association football midfielders
English Football League players
Torquay United F.C. players
Bath City F.C. players
Yeovil Town F.C. players
Westbury United F.C. players
Cheltenham Town F.C. players
Clevedon Town F.C. players
Yate Town F.C. players
Forest Green Rovers F.C. players
Taunton Town F.C. players
Trowbridge Town F.C. players
Keynsham Town F.C. players
Paulton Rovers F.C. players
English football managers
Paulton Rovers F.C. managers
Bristol City F.C. non-playing staff
Association football coaches
Association football scouts